The 2005–06 season saw Associazione Sportiva Roma experience several ups and downs, as it went through periods of poor form which bracketed a then-record 11 match winning streak in Serie A. Despite this period of excellent form, the club originally finished just fifth in the final standings, before Juventus, Milan and Fiorentina all were declared of varying guilt in a scandal that rocked Italian football in the summer of 2006. The resulting point deductions directed toward all three aforementioned clubs promoted Roma to second in the final standings.

The season also saw Roma hit with a one-year transfer ban, since it poached Philippe Mexès from Auxerre in spite of a rolling contract in 2004. Before the axe fell, Roma had already made its summer signings Doni, Samuel Kuffour, Rodrigo Taddei and Shabani Nonda, which made the ban redundant. It did however, delay Antonio Cassano's long-awaited transfer to Real Madrid, which lifted the morale of the squad following Cassano's long-time public feud with captain Francesco Totti.

Players

Squad information
Last updated on 14 May 2006
Appearances include league matches only

Competitions

Overall

Last updated: 14 May 2006

Serie A

League table

Results summary

Results by round

Matches

Coppa Italia

Round of 16

Quarter-finals

Semi-finals

Final

UEFA Cup

First round

Group stage

Final phase

Round of 32

Round of 16

Statistics

Appearances and goals

|-
! colspan=14 style="background:#B21B1C; color:#FFD700; text-align:center"| Goalkeepers

|-
! colspan=14 style="background:#B21B1C; color:#FFD700; text-align:center"| Defenders

|-
! colspan=14 style="background:#B21B1C; color:#FFD700; text-align:center"| Midfielders

|-
! colspan=14 style="background:#B21B1C; color:#FFD700; text-align:center"| Forwards

|-
! colspan=14 style="background:#B21B1C; color:#FFD700; text-align:center"| Players transferred out during the season

Goalscorers

Last updated: 14 May 2006

Clean sheets

Last updated: 14 May 2006

Disciplinary record

Last updated:

References

A.S. Roma seasons
Roma